Talmage Holt "Tal" Stafford (January 7, 1890 – May 24, 1967) was an American football and baseball player, coach of football, basketball, and baseball, and college athletics administrator.  He served as the head football coach at North Carolina State University in 1918, compiling a record of 1–3.  Stafford was also head basketball coach at NC State that same academic year, 1918–19, tallying a mark of 11–3, and the baseball coach at the school in the spring of 1919, amassing a record of 12–11.

He was also the founding coach of the Cary High School football team in Cary, North Carolina.

Head coaching record

Football

Baseball

References

External links
 
 

1890 births
1967 deaths
American football ends
American football quarterbacks
Baseball pitchers
NC State Wolfpack athletic directors
NC State Wolfpack baseball coaches
NC State Wolfpack baseball players
NC State Wolfpack football coaches
NC State Wolfpack football players
NC State Wolfpack men's basketball coaches
Minor league baseball players
Sportspeople from Raleigh, North Carolina
Players of American football from Raleigh, North Carolina
Baseball players from Raleigh, North Carolina
Basketball coaches from North Carolina